The 2019 Supercoppa Italiana was the 23rd edition of the Supercoppa Italiana. It was contested by Juventus, the 2018–19 Serie A and 2018–19 Italian Women's Cup champions and Fiorentina, the runners-up of the two competitions.

The match was played in Cesena at Stadio Dino Manuzzi on 27 October 2019 and Juventus won their first title.

Match

References 

Football in Italy
Sport in Italy
Football competitions in Italy
2019–20 in Italian women's football
Supercoppa Italiana (women)
Juventus F.C. (women) matches